Between the Spark and the Burn is a young adult Gothic / horror novel written by April Genevieve Tucholke and published on August 14, 2014 by Dial Books for Young Readers, an imprint of Penguin Books. It is a sequel to Between the Devil and the Deep Blue Sea, which was published in 2013.

Plot
Last summer the Redding brothers - crooked-smiling liar River, laughing, hot-tempered Neely; and mad, knife-wielding Brodie - descended upon Violet White's dreamy seaside town, bringing chaos.

Then Brodie and River disappeared.

Now a rattling unease fills Vi.

So when she catches a late-night radio show whispering of eerie events in a distant mountain village, she seizes on it - this could be River or Brodie. Vi and Neely's search takes them to frenzied mountain towns, cursed islands, and an empty, snow-muffled hotel. They find a girl who's seen the devil, a sea captain's daughter, and a sweet, red-haired forest boy who meets death halfway. All the while, Vi's feelings for Neely grow sharper, the stakes higher, and the truth harder to pin down. If only Violet knew that while she's been hunting the Redding boys... someone's been hunting her.

Characters
Violet White: teenage girl, protagonist and narrator
River Redding: teenage boy with mysterious powers and a mysterious past
Luke White: Violet's brother, artist
Sunshine Black: Violet's best friend
Neely Redding: River's brother
Brodie Redding: The third Redding brother
Freddie White: Violet's dead grandmother
Cassie Black: Sunshine's Mother 
Sam Black: Sunshine's Father 
Will Redding: The Grandfather of River, Neely, & Brodie. Also had the glow but called it the burn. He relations with Violet's grandmother, Freddie.
Chase Glenship: Lived at Glenship Manor. The boy Will Redding had wanted Freddie to marry. The eldest son who killed a girl in the Glenship cellar. 
Rose Redding: Will's Sister. River & Neely's great aunt. Killed when she was 16 by Chase Glenship.

Reception
The critical reception for the book has been positive. The School Library Journal reviewer wrote "The lush and polished prose, eerie locales, and pervading sense of dark unease are as engrossing as they were in the first installment." Kirkus Reviews said of the book, "Violet is both intuitive and naïve, capable of profound revelation . . . The faded opulence of the setting is an ideal backdrop for this lushly atmospheric gothic thriller, which, happily, comes with a satisfying conclusion. Darkly romantic and evocative."

Further reading
Kirkus Reviews. "Between the Spark and the Burn." Kirkus Reviews. Web. 4 May 2014.
Serra, Danielle. "Between the Spark and the Burn." School Library Journal. Web. 12 Jun. 2014.

References

External links

Author's website

American young adult novels
2014 American novels
American gothic novels
American horror novels
Novels set in Maine
Dial Press books